Alpha 7 is a science fiction anthology edited by Robert Silverberg first published in 1977.

Contents
Introduction by Robert Silverberg
"Dune Roller" by Julian May
"Shape" by Robert Sheckley
"Transfer Point" by Anthony Boucher
"A Galaxy Called Rome" by Barry N. Malzberg
"Rejoice, Rejoice, We Have No Choice" by Terry Carr
"Orphans of the Void" by Michael Shaara
"The Luckiest Man in Denv" by C. M. Kornbluth
"For Love" by Algis Budrys
"World War II" by George Alec Effinger
"The Night of Hoggy Darn" by Robert McKenna

References
 Goodreads listing for Alpha 7
 MIT Science Fiction Society's Library Pinkdex Entry for Alpha 7

1977 anthologies
Science fiction anthologies
Robert Silverberg anthologies